Niek den Heeten (born in Bergschenhoek on 5 April 2001) is a Dutch footballer who plays as midfielder for ASWH.

Club career 
Niek den Heeten played in the youth of CVV Berkel, BVCB, and Excelsior Rotterdam. In the 2019–20 season of Excelsior, as a youth player, he already trained and benched for the first squad. 

Den Heeten signed a one-year professional contract with Excelsior in 2020.  His official debut in the Eerste Divisie took place on 28 September 2020, in the 3-0 lost away-match against Jong Ajax. In the 90+1 minute, he replaced Julian Baas. He played in a total of five games in the first squad of Excelsior, four in the Eerste Divisie and one for the national KNVB Cup.

In the summer of 2021, Den Heeten started an internship on the second team of Racing de Santander in Spain. For personal reasons, Den Heeten quit Santander and, in October 2021, joined VV Noordwijk in the Tweede Divisie. In the summer of 2022, he changed sides to ASWH in the Derde Divisie.

References 

ASWH players
Dutch footballers
Excelsior Rotterdam players
Rayo Cantabria players
VV Noordwijk players
Living people
2001 births
People from Lansingerland
Footballers from South Holland
Eerste Divisie players
Tweede Divisie players
Derde Divisie players